3 Kanya or Teen Kanya (2012) is a Bengali psychological thriller film directed by Agnidev Chatterjee. The film tells a story of lives of three women. The characters are played by Rituparna Sengupta, Ananya Chatterjee and Unnati Davara.

Plot
The story of the film revolves around the lives of three women– Aparna, Damini and Nancy. Aparna is a journalist. She suspects that her husband is having an affair with Damini, an IPS officer. Aparna's husband is kidnapped. Aparna goes to meet Damini and a relationship between Aparna and Damini begins. Nancy is a call-girl who is raped. She lodges a complaint to the local council but it goes in vain. She then approaches a news channel where Aparna is a journalist, Aparna helps her to get justice.

Cast
 Main cast
 Rituparna Sengupta as Aparna Dutta
 Ananya Chatterjee as Nancy Sen
 Unnati Davara as Damini Mishra
 Rajatava Dutta as Subhash Sen
 Sudip Mukherjee as Rajatabha Dutta
 Biplab Chatterjee as Biswanath Banerjee
 Shankar Chakrabarty as Kali Babu
 Suman Bannerjee as Arijit Da
 Anindya Banerjee as Vicky
 Joydeep Ckhraborty (as a sweeper)

 Friendly appearance
 Subhasish Mukherjee
 Biswanath Basu
 Arindam Sil
 Vikram Chatterjee

 Guest appearance
 Bratya Basu

Soundtrack

References

External links
 
 

2012 films
Bengali-language Indian films
2010s Bengali-language films
2012 psychological thriller films
Indian LGBT-related films
2012 LGBT-related films
Films directed by Agnidev Chatterjee
Films scored by Indradeep Dasgupta
Indian psychological thriller films
LGBT-related thriller films